Deception Pass Bridge is the common name for two, two-lane bridges on Washington State Route 20 connecting Whidbey Island in Island County, to Fidalgo Island in Skagit County, in the U.S. state of Washington. It was a Washington State Highways project, and included project elements built by young workers from the Civilian Conservation Corps. Completion of the bridge was a factor in the decision to build Naval Air Station Whidbey Island and helped Oak Harbor flourish. The bridge is a commonly photographed landmark of the Puget Sound region.

History

In the spring of 1792, Joseph Whidbey, master of HMS Discovery and Captain Vancouver's chief navigator proved that it was not really a small bay as charted by the Spaniards (hence the name "Deception"), but a deep and turbulent channel that connects the Strait of Juan de Fuca with the Saratoga Passage, which separates the mainland from what they believed was a peninsula (actually Fidalgo Island and Whidbey Island). Thomas Coupe, a sea captain and founder of Coupeville, was the only man ever to sail a full-rigged ship through the strait discovered by Whidbey.

In the early years of the 20th century, travelers of the horse-and-buggy era used an unscheduled ferry to cross from Fidalgo Island to Whidbey Island. To call the ferry, they banged a saw with a mallet and then sat back to wait.

The bridge, one of the scenic wonders of the Pacific Northwest, is actually two spans, one over Canoe Pass to the north, and another over Deception Pass to the south. Pass Island lies between the two bridges. Construction began in August 1934, and the completed bridge was dedicated at noon on July 31, 1935. The Wallace Bridge and Structural Co. of Seattle, Washington provided 460 tons of steel for the  Canoe Pass arch and 1130 tons for the  Deception Pass span. The cost of the New Deal-era construction was $482,000, made possible through the Public Works Administration and county funds.

In 1982, the bridge was listed in the National Register of Historic Places ahead of a repainting project that cost more than the original construction cost. A second repainting was completed in 1997.  The bridge will retain its current color, named "Evergreen Green", using lead-free paint; the project also includes replacement of steel pieces that have signs of corrosion.

Bridge Facts
 Roadway: two  lanes, one in each direction
 Sidewalks:  sidewalk on each side
 Width of bridge deck: 
 Total length:  (more than a quarter mile)
 Canoe Pass: one  arch and three concrete T-beam approach spans
 Deception Pass: two  cantilever spans, one  suspended span, and four concrete T-beam approach spans
 Vehicle crossings: 20,000 per day on average
 Maximum speed of current in Deception Pass at flood/ebb tide: 9 kts
 Maximum speed of current in Canoe Pass at flood/ebb tide: 10 kts
 12 total suicides by jumping from the bridge in 2009 and 15 in 2010

See also
List of bridges documented by the Historic American Engineering Record in Washington (state)

References

External links

Deception Pass Park Foundation webpage

Maritime Heritage Network

Bridges completed in 1935
Transportation buildings and structures in Island County, Washington
Road bridges on the National Register of Historic Places in Washington (state)
Transportation buildings and structures in Skagit County, Washington
Civilian Conservation Corps in Washington (state)
Historic American Engineering Record in Washington (state)
National Register of Historic Places in Island County, Washington
National Register of Historic Places in Skagit County, Washington
Open-spandrel deck arch bridges in the United States
Steel bridges in the United States
Cantilever bridges in the United States